Agenda is a British current affairs television programme that was broadcast on BBC Scotland during the early part of the 1980s, airing mostly on Sundays at 1:25 pm before being moved to Friday evening. It was a successor to the general current affairs programme Current Account, which ran from 1968 until May 1983. Agenda's first presenter was James Cox with Kenneth Cargill producing.  The editor was Matthew Spicer.

Subsequently, the former SNP politician George Reid presented the programme and the producer was Kirsty Wark, later to become a television presenter in her own right. The series was replaced by Left, Right and Centre.

Past presenters and reporters

James Cox
John Foster
George Reid
 Kenneth Roy

Past directors and producers

Kenneth Cargill
 Kirsty Wark

See also
BBC News

BBC Regional News shows
BBC Scotland television shows
1980s Scottish television series
1981 Scottish television series debuts
1984 Scottish television series endings